Chillingollah is a locality in Victoria, Australia, located approximately 52 km from Swan Hill, Victoria.

Chillingollah Post Office opened on 1 July 1905 and closed in 1973.

References

Towns in Victoria (Australia)
Rural City of Swan Hill